Nicomen First Nation is a Nlaka'pamux First Nations government located near Lytton, British Columbia.  It is a member of the Fraser Canyon Indian Administration as well as of the Scw’exmx Tribal Council, which are two of three tribal councils of the Nlaka'pamux people.    The third is the Nlaka'pamux Nation Tribal Council.

The Nicomen First Nation reserve community and offices are located near Lytton in the lower Thompson Canyon.

Chief and Councillors

Treaty Process

History
The Nicomen First Nation is located near the confluence of the Thompson and Nicoamen Rivers.  It was in this area that the first major gold finds of what would become the Fraser Canyon Gold Rush were found, and the first quarrels between First Nations miners and American miners began, which would culminate in the Fraser Canyon War of the fall of 1858.

Demographics
The total population of the citizens of the Band, as of 2001 was 89.

Economic Development

Social, Educational and Cultural Programs and Facilities

Indian Reserves
Nicomen Indian Band has jurisdiction over the following reserves:

 Nicomen 1
 Kykinalko 2
 Sackum 3
 Gualada 3A
 Skhpowtz 4
 Klahkowit 5
 Sleetsis 6
 Shoskhost 7
 Unputpulquatum 8
 Skeikut 9
 Squianny 10
 Enhalt 11
 Skaynaneichst 12
 Naykikoulth 13
 Putkwa 14
 Shuouchten 15

See also
Thompson language
Nlaka'pamux Nation Tribal Council

References

Indian and Northern Affairs Canada - First Nation Detail

Nlaka'pamux governments
Thompson Country